Chloe Veitch (born 6 March 1999) is an English model and media personality, beauty queen of Miss Supertalent 2018. She is best known for her appearances in Too Hot To Handle (2020), The Circle (2021) and Perfect Match (2023). Veitch has also appeared on Channel 4's Celebrity Ghost Trip (2021), where she was partnered with Too Hot To Handle co-star Nicole O'Brien, and Celebrity Hunted (2022).

Veitch was joint winner of Netflix's first series of Too Hot To Handle. She was also voted as the runner-up and won the "Fan Favorite" award for the second season of The Circle.

Biography 

Veitch grew up in Clacton-on-Sea in Essex, and went to Clacton Coastal Academy school. Before appearing on Too Hot To Handle, Veitch was an estate agent and model. Veitch currently lives in London and has stated that she plans to move to the United States of America for work.

Filmography

Television

References 

Living people
People from Essex
People from Clacton-on-Sea
Participants in British reality television series
1999 births
English female models